The Charles B. Anderson House is an historic house in Elfers, Florida, United States owned by Pasco County. On April 26, 1996, it was added to the U.S. National Register of Historic Places.

References

External links

 Pasco County listings at National Register of Historic Places
 Florida's Office of Cultural and Historical Programs
 Pasco County listings

Houses on the National Register of Historic Places in Florida
Houses in Pasco County, Florida
National Register of Historic Places in Pasco County, Florida
1938 establishments in Florida
Houses completed in 1938
Shingle Style houses
Shingle Style architecture in Florida